Robert Graham Glendinning PC (5 April 1844 – 8 June 1928) was a businessman and the Member of Parliament (MP) for  North Antrim from 1906 to 1910.  He was director of Glendinning. M'Leish and Co., Ltd.; Larabeg Weaving Co., Ltd.; Co. Down Weaving Co., Ltd.: W. R. Nelson & Co., Ltd.; Barron & Co., Ltd., Belfast.

Glendinning's great-grandchildren include Robin and Will Glendinning.

References

External links 
 

1844 births
1928 deaths
UK MPs 1906–1910
Members of the Parliament of the United Kingdom for County Antrim constituencies (1801–1922)
Members of the Privy Council of Ireland
Russellite Unionist MPs